John Bernard Tait (born January 26, 1975) is a former American football offensive tackle, who played for both the Kansas City Chiefs and the Chicago Bears of the National Football League. He was selected with the 14th overall pick in the 1999 NFL Draft by the Kansas City Chiefs out of Brigham Young University (BYU) and played for the Chiefs for five years. He also played for the Chicago Bears.

Early years
He is a 1993 graduate of McClintock High School in Tempe, Arizona.

At Brigham Young University, Tait started 38 games during his three-year college career. Tait was an All-America pick his final season and earned first-team All-WAC honors as a sophomore and a junior. Eligible for a fifth year of college action after redshirting as a true freshman in 1993, Tait declared for the draft. He served as the captain for the BYU offense and started all 13 games at left tackle as a junior. He was a first-team All-WAC choice, earned first-team All-America honors from Football News (1998), was named National Offensive Lineman-of-the-Year by The Sports Network and received a freshman All-America nod from The Sporting News.

Professional career

Kansas City Chiefs
Regarded as the No. 1 offensive tackle available in the 1999 NFL Draft, Tait was selected 14th overall by the Chiefs. Sports Illustrated described him as "a pure left tackle" with "no real physical weaknesses".

As a rookie in Kansas City, Tait held out during the negotiation of his first contract. There was a meeting between Tait, his two agents and Chiefs general manager Carl Peterson, wherein Tait and his agents left. Shortly afterward Tait signed an offer sheet for five years.

At the end of Tait's contract with the Chiefs, the team put a transition tag on him.

Chicago Bears
Tait signed with the Chicago Bears in 2004. His contract was for six years and $34 million. On February 21, 2009, Tait announced his retirement.

References

1975 births
Living people
Players of American football from Phoenix, Arizona
American football offensive tackles
BYU Cougars football players
Kansas City Chiefs players
Chicago Bears players
American Latter Day Saints
Brian Piccolo Award winners